In mathematics, an arithmetic group is a group obtained as the integer points of an algebraic group, for example  They arise naturally in the study of arithmetic properties of quadratic forms and other classical topics in number theory. They also give rise to very interesting examples of Riemannian manifolds and hence are objects of interest in differential geometry and topology. Finally, these two topics join in the theory of automorphic forms which is fundamental in modern number theory.

History

One of the origins of the mathematical theory of arithmetic groups is algebraic number theory. The classical reduction theory of quadratic and Hermitian forms by Charles Hermite, Hermann Minkowski and others can be seen as computing fundamental domains for the action of certain arithmetic groups on the relevant symmetric spaces. The topic was related to Minkowski's geometry of numbers and the early development of the study of arithmetic invariant of number fields such as the discriminant. Arithmetic groups can be thought of as a vast generalisation of the unit groups of number fields to a noncommutative setting.

The same groups also appeared in analytic number theory as the study of classical modular forms and their generalisations developed. Of course the two topics were related, as can be seen for example in Langlands' computation of the volume of certain fundamental domains using analytic methods. This classical theory culminated with the work of Siegel, who showed the finiteness of the volume of a fundamental domain in many cases.

For the modern theory to begin foundational work was needed, and was provided by the work of Armand Borel, André Weil, Jacques Tits and others on algebraic groups. Shortly afterwards the finiteness of covolume was proven in full generality by Borel and Harish-Chandra. Meanwhile, there was progress on the general theory of lattices in Lie groups by Atle Selberg, Grigori Margulis,  David Kazhdan, M. S. Raghunathan and others. The state of the art after this period was essentially fixed in Raghunathan's treatise, published in 1972.

In the seventies Margulis revolutionised the topic by proving that in "most" cases the arithmetic constructions account for all lattices in a given Lie group. Some limited results in this direction had been obtained earlier by Selberg, but Margulis' methods (the use of ergodic-theoretical tools for actions on homogeneous spaces) were completely new in this context and were to be extremely influential on later developments, effectively renewing the old subject of geometry of numbers and allowing Margulis himself to prove the Oppenheim conjecture; stronger results (Ratner's theorems) were later obtained by Marina Ratner.

In another direction the classical topic of modular forms has blossomed into the modern theory of automorphic forms. The driving force behind this effort is mainly the Langlands program initiated by Robert Langlands. One of the main tool used there is the trace formula originating in Selberg's work and developed in the most general setting by James Arthur.

Finally arithmetic groups are often used to construct interesting examples of locally symmetric Riemannian manifolds. A particularly active research topic has been arithmetic hyperbolic 3-manifolds, which as William Thurston wrote, "...often seem to have special beauty."

Definition and construction

Arithmetic groups 

With this definition, to the algebraic group  is associated a collection of "discrete" subgroups all commensurable to each other.

Using number fields 

If we are given an embedding  defined over  then the subgroup  can legitimately be called an arithmetic group.

On the other hand, the class of groups thus obtained is not larger than the class of arithmetic groups as defined above.

Examples

For  the group , or sometimes , is called the modular group as it is related to the modular curve. Similar examples are the Siegel modular groups .

Another classical example is given by the integral elements in the orthogonal group of a quadratic form defined over a number field, for example . A related construction is by taking the unit groups of orders in quaternion algebras over number fields (for example the Hurwitz quaternion order). Similar constructions can be performed with unitary groups of hermitian forms, a well-known example is the Picard modular group.

Arithmetic lattices in semisimple Lie groups 

The Borel–Harish-Chandra theorem 

A lattice in a Lie group is usually defined as a discrete subgroup with finite covolume. The terminology introduced above is coherent with this, as a theorem due to Borel and Harish-Chandra states that an arithmetic subgroup in a semisimple Lie group is of finite covolume (the discreteness is obvious).

The theorem is more precise: it says that the arithmetic lattice is cocompact if and only if the "form" of  used to define it (i.e. the -group ) is anisotropic.

Margulis arithmeticity theorem 

The spectacular result that Margulis obtained is a partial converse to the Borel—Harish-Chandra theorem: for certain Lie groups any lattice is arithmetic. This result is true for all irreducible lattice in semisimple Lie groups of real rank larger than two. The main new ingredient that Margulis used to prove his theorem was the superrigidity of lattices in higher-rank groups that he proved for this purpose.

Irreducibility only plays a role when  has a factor of real rank one (otherwise the theorem always holds) and is not simple: it means that for any product decomposition  the lattice is not commensurable to a product of lattices in each of the factors .

There are no known non-arithmetic lattices in the groups  when .

Arithmetic Fuchsian and Kleinian groups 

It is asked that for one embedding  the algebra  be isomorphic to the matrix algebra  and for all others to the Hamilton quaternions.

They exhaust all arithmetic commensurability classes in

Classification 

The congruence subgroup problem 

A congruence subgroup is (roughly) a subgroup of an arithmetic group defined by taking all matrices satisfying certain equations modulo an integer, for example the group of 2 by 2 integer matrices with diagonal (respectively off-diagonal) coefficients congruent to 1 (respectively 0) modulo a positive integer. These are always finite-index subgroups and the congruence subgroup problem roughly asks whether all subgroups are obtained in this way. The conjecture (usually attributed to Jean-Pierre Serre) is that this is true for (irreducible) arithmetic lattices in higher-rank groups and false in rank-one groups. It is still open in this generality but there are many results establishing it for specific lattices (in both its positive and negative cases).

S-arithmetic groups 

Instead of taking integral points in the definition of an arithmetic lattice one can take points which are only integral away from a finite number of primes. This leads to the notion of an -arithmetic lattice (where  stands for the set of primes inverted). They are also naturally lattices in certain topological groups, for example  is a lattice in

Definition 

Lattices in Lie groups over local fields 

The Borel–Harish-Chandra theorem generalizes to -arithmetic groups as follows: if  is an -arithmetic group in a -algebraic group  then  is a lattice in the locally compact group

.

Some applications

Explicit expander graphs 

Arithmetic groups with Kazhdan's property (T) or the weaker property of Lubotzky and Zimmer can be used to construct expander graphs (Margulis), or even Ramanujan graphs(Lubotzky—Phillips—Sarnak). Such graphs are known to exist in abundance by probabilistic results but the explicit nature of these constructions makes them interesting.

Extremal surfaces and graphs 

Congruence covers of arithmetic surfaces are known to give rise to surfaces with large injectivity radius. Likewise the Ramanujan graphs constructed by Lubotzky—Phillips—Sarnak have large girth. It is in fact known that the Ramanujan property itself implies that the local girths of the graph are almost always large.

Isospectral manifolds 

Arithmetic groups can be used to construct isospectral manifolds. This was first realised by Marie-France Vignéras and numerous variations on her construction have appeared since. The isospectrality problem is in fact particularly amenable to study in the restricted setting of arithmetic manifolds.

Fake projective planes 

A fake projective plane is a complex surface which has the same Betti numbers as the projective plane  but is not biholomorphic to it; the first example was discovered by Mumford. The possible lattices have been classified by Prasad and Yeung and the classification was completed by Cartwright and Steger who checked that they actually correspond to fake projective planes.

References

Algebraic groups
Group theory
Number theory
Differential geometry